Nathaniel Levi Gaines (1971 – July 4, 1996) was an African-American resident of Yonkers, New York who, in a case of illegal use of deadly force, was fatally shot by a member of the New York City Transit Police, a division of the New York City Police Department. Gaines was a veteran of service in the Persian Gulf War, and was known to have no criminal record, nor any history of encounters with police or law enforcement agencies.

Shooting
The July 4, 1996 altercation between Gaines and police officer Paolo Colecchia, which resulted in Gaines' death, occurred on the 167th Street subway station platform of the "D" line in the Bronx. Collechia reported after the incident that there had been a struggle between himself and Gaines in the subway station, claiming that Gaines had tried to grab his gun and push him onto the railway track. However, it became clear that the officer knew during the struggle that Gaines was not in possession of any weapon.

Controversy
Due to the nature of the crime, and the fact that the officer was white and the victim black, the story caused large scale disruption and controversy across New York. As well as racial discord, there was also controversy over the actions of police officers and their conduct and the increasing number of officers accused of using excessive force.

Criminal charges
Collechia, who had a history of civilian complaints made against him to the NYPD, was sentenced to a maximum of 5–15 years in prison for homicide, the city's third police officer to be sentenced for committing the crime while on active duty.

See also
List of killings by law enforcement officers in the United States

References

Police brutality in the United States
Murdered African-American people
Male murder victims
People from Yonkers, New York
1971 births
1996 deaths
People murdered in New York City
African-American military personnel
Deaths by firearm in the Bronx
Highbridge, Bronx
African Americans shot dead by law enforcement officers in the United States
People murdered by law enforcement officers in the United States
American military personnel of the Gulf War
20th-century African-American people